The Brooks Wallace Award is an award given by the College Baseball Foundation (CBF) to the best college baseball shortstop of the year. The award has been given annually since 2004. Until 2008 the award was presented to the nation's most outstanding player; however, in 2009 the recipient list was changed to only include shortstops. It is named after former Texas Tech shortstop and assistant coach Brooks Wallace, who died of cancer in 1985 at the age of 27.

Winners

See also

 List of college baseball awards
 Baseball awards#U.S. college baseball
 College Baseball Hall of Fame

Notes

References

External links
 College Baseball Foundation (CBF) official website.
 CBF College Baseball Awards Show official webpage.
 2009 College Baseball Foundation Awards Show MLB.com; MLB Advanced Media, L.P.

College baseball trophies and awards in the United States
Most valuable player awards
Awards established in 2004
Baseball in Lubbock, Texas